Stoney is the debut studio album by American rapper and singer Post Malone. It was released on December 9, 2016, by Republic Records. The album features guest appearances from Justin Bieber, Kehlani, and Quavo. The deluxe edition was released on the same day. It features an additional guest appearance from 2 Chainz. The production on the album was handled by Malone himself, Mustard, Metro Boomin, Vinylz, Frank Dukes, Illangelo, Charlie Handsome, Rex Kudo, Foreign Teck, and Pharrell Williams, among others. Malone generally sing-raps on the album, which is noted for its woozy, contemporary R&B-hip hop production. The album also features influence from country and outlaw country music.

Stoney debuted at number six on the Billboard 200 and later peaked at number four on the chart. The album was certified 5× platinum by the Recording Industry Association of America (RIAA) and platinum by the British Phonographic Industry (BPI). The single "Congratulations", which features Quavo, was certified Diamond (11× platinum) by the RIAA and was Malone's biggest Billboard Hot 100 hit at the time.

Background
On August 14, 2015, Post Malone released his debut single, "White Iverson". The single became his breakthrough song. Due to his success with that single, Malone got the attention of a number of prominent rappers such as Kanye West and Young Thug, among others. Malone and Canadian singer Justin Bieber verged into a friendship, when Bieber made Malone as one of the opening acts for his Purpose World Tour to support the release of his fourth studio album, Purpose (2015).

On June 9, 2016, Malone made his national television debut on Jimmy Kimmel Live!, performing the song, "Go Flex". In June 2016, XXL editor-in chief Vanessa Satten, revealed that Malone was considered to be on XXLs "2016's Freshmen Class" magazine cover, however, she was "told by his camp that he wasn't paying attention to hip hop so much. He was going into more of a rock / pop / country direction." Malone denied these claims, saying: "My love of music should never be questioned... I shouldn't be chastised for expressing myself in whichever way I see fit." He went on to explain that his mixtape, as well as his then-upcoming album are both hip hop: "I have a hip-hop album coming out in August... I made a HIP HOP mixtape promoting my HIP HOP album."

On May 12, 2016, in preparation for the release of Stoney, Malone released his debut mixtape, August 26th. The title of the mixtape was a reference to the original release date of the album.

On December 9, 2021, which was the album's fifth anniversary, Malone released Stoney (Complete Edition) on streaming platforms.  The updated version of the album included instrumentals of every song on the album besides "White Iverson" and "Feeling Whitney."

Singles
The album's lead single, "White Iverson", was released on August 14, 2015. The song was solely produced by Malone himself. It peaked at number 14 on the US Billboard Hot 100 and was certified 8× platinum by the Recording Industry Association of America (RIAA).

The album's second single, "Too Young", was released on October 9, 2015. The song was produced by Foreign Teck, Rico Evans, and Justin Mosley. It was certified platinum by the RIAA.

The album's third single, "Go Flex", was released on April 21, 2016. The song was produced by Rex Kudo and Charlie Handsome. It peaked at number 76 on the Hot 100 and was certified 4× platinum by the RIAA.
 
The album's fourth single, "Deja Vu", which features Canadian singer Justin Bieber, was released on September 9, 2016. The song was produced by Frank Dukes and Vinylz. It peaked at number 75 on the Hot 100 and was certified platinum by the RIAA.

The fifth single, "Congratulations", which features American rapper Quavo, was sent to rhythmic radio on January 31, 2017. It was originally released as a promotional single on November 4, 2016. The song was produced by Metro Boomin and Frank Dukes, and additionally produced by Louis Bell. It peaked at number eight on the Hot 100 and was certified 11× platinum by the RIAA, surpassing diamond certification (10× platinum) and becoming Malone's biggest and first international hit.

The album's sixth and final single, "I Fall Apart", was sent to rhythmic radio on October 17, 2017. The song was solely produced by Illangelo. peaked at number 16 on the Hot 100 and was certified 7× platinum by the RIAA.

Promotional singles
The album's first promotional single, "Patient", was released on November 18, 2016. The song was solely produced by Louis Bell. It was certified platinum by the RIAA.

The album's second promotional single, "Leave", was released on December 2, 2016. The song was produced by Rex Kudo, Charlie Handsome, and Cashio.

Critical reception

Comparing the album to Malone's debut single, "White Iverson", Glenn Gamboa of Newsday wrote that he "follows through with that style on Stoney, but it generally pales in comparison to the inventiveness and the surprise of that track." Neil Z. Yeung of AllMusic commented that Stoney is "competent and listenable, but many others have tread this same path already. Post Malone has a way to go before standing out with his own unique voice, but there are signs on Stoney that it could happen."

Accolades

Commercial performance
Stoney debuted at number six on the US Billboard 200 with 58,000 album-equivalent units, of which 19,000 were pure album sales. In its second week, the album dropped to number 23 on the chart, selling an additional 30,000 units. On June 6, 2018, the album was certified three-times platinum by the Recording Industry Association of America (RIAA) for combined sales and album-equivalent units of over three million units. On the week of October 28, 2017, the album peaked at number four on the US Billboard 200. By the end of 2017, Stoney had sold 1,564,000 album-equivalent units with 128,000 being pure sales. By September 2018, Stoney had sold 1,044,000 album-equivalent units that year.

Track listing
Credits adapted from the album's liner notes, Tidal, and BMI.

Notes
  signifies an additional producer
  signifies a co-producer
 "Deja Vu" features background vocals from Kaan Güneşberk
 "Cold" features background vocals from River Tiber
 "Go Flex" features background vocals from Charlie Handsome and Peter Lee Johnson
 "Leave" features background vocals from Peter Lee Johnson
 "Feeling Whitney" features background vocals from Andrew Watt and Josh Gudwin

Sample credits
 "Big Lie" contains an interpolation from "Clouds", as performed by Gigi Masin.
 "No Option" contains excerpts from "Levitate", written by Michael Hancock, Michael McGinnis, and Christopher Rude, as performed by Viigo.

Personnel
Credits adapted from the album's liner notes and Tidal.

Musicians

 Post Malone – guitar 
 Peter Lee Johnson – strings , guitar 
 Matthew Tavares – guitar, bass, keyboards 
 Frank Dukes – percussion 
 Vinylz – percussion 
 Andrew Watt – guitar , bass, string arrangement 
 Charlie Handsome – drums , guitar , keyboards , bass 
 Rex Kudo – drums 
 Idan Kalai – bass, drums, keyboards 
 Brent Paschke – electric guitars 
 Leon Thomas – guitars, bass 
 Khari Mateen – cello 
 Jessy Greene – cello , violin 

Technical

 Rex Kudo – recording 
 Idan Kalai – recording 
 Andrew Maury – mixing 
 Mike Bozzi – mastering 
 Louis Bell – recording 
 Alex Pavone – recording assistance 
 Manny Marroquin – mixing 
 Chris Galland – mixing assistance 
 Robin Florent – mixing assistance 
 Scott Desmarais – mixing assistance 
 Jeff Jackson – mixing assistance 
 Illangelo – recording 
 Ike Schultz – mixing assistance 
 Big Bass Brian - mastering 
 Adam Feeney – recording 
 Andrew Coleman – recording 
 Dave Rowland – recording 
 Mike Larson – additional recording 
 David Kim – recording assistance 
 Josh Gudwin – recording , mixing 
 Nicolas Essig – recording 

Additional personnel

 Dre London – management
 Rob Stevenson – A&R
 Tyler Arnold – A&R
 Jim Roppo – marketing
 Marleny Dominguez – marketing
 Theo Sedlmayr – legal
 Bryan Rivera – art direction
 Travis Brothers – art direction
 Henock Sileshi – art direction
 Bobby Greenleaf – art direction
 Nabil Elderkin – photography

Charts

Weekly charts

Year-end charts

Decade-end charts

Certifications

Notes

References

2016 debut albums
Post Malone albums
Albums produced by Post Malone
Republic Records albums
Albums produced by Andrew Watt (record producer)
Albums produced by Metro Boomin
Albums produced by Illangelo
Albums produced by Frank Dukes
Albums produced by Pharrell Williams
Albums produced by Vinylz
Albums produced by DJ Mustard
Albums produced by Louis Bell
Country albums by American artists